Sleeping Murder: Miss Marple's Last Case is a work of detective fiction by Agatha Christie and first published in the UK by the Collins Crime Club in October 1976 and in the US by Dodd, Mead and Company later in the same year. The UK edition retailed for £3.50 and the US edition for $7.95.

The book features Miss Marple. Released posthumously, it was the last published Christie novel, although not the last Miss Marple novel in order of writing. The story is explicitly set in 1944 but the first draft of the novel was possibly written during the Blitz in 1940. Miss Marple aids a young couple who choose to uncover events in the wife's past life, and not let sleeping murder lie.

Plot summary
Newlywed Gwenda Reed travels ahead of her husband to find a home for them on the south coast of England. In a short time, she finds and buys Hillside, a large old house that feels just like home. She supervises workers in a renovation, staying in a one-time nursery room while the work progresses. She forms a definite idea for the little nursery. When the workmen open a long sealed door, she sees the very wallpaper that was in her mind. Further, a place that seems logical to her for a doorway between two rooms proves to have been one years earlier. She goes to London for a visit with relatives, the author Raymond West, his wife, and his aunt, Miss Jane Marple. During the play, The Duchess of Malfi, when the line "Cover her face; mine eyes dazzle; she died young" is spoken, Gwenda screams out; she saw an image of herself viewing a man saying those words strangling a blonde-haired woman named Helen.

Gwenda was born in India where her father was stationed, then raised in New Zealand by her mother's sister from a toddler, once her mother died. Her father died a few years after her mother. She has memories of being on a ship, but it is clearly two ships. Miss Marple suggests that Gwenda lived in England with her father and his second wife, which proves to be the case. Her stepmother, Helen Halliday née Kennedy, met her father travelling from India back to England, where their shipboard romance led to marriage upon arrival in England. They rented a house in Dillmouth, where Helen grew up. The coincidences prove to be memories from Gwenda's stay in that house 18 years ago as a very young child. Now Gwenda ponders her frightening image and the closing words of the play: are they real memories as well? Her husband Giles arrives from New Zealand and the couple decide to pursue this mystery.

Helen was raised mainly by her half brother, Dr Kennedy, now retired from practice and moved to another village. He replies to an advertisement placed by Giles seeking information about Helen.

Miss Marple arranges to visit friends in Dillmouth. Miss Marple is often at the house, pulling out bindweed from the neglected garden. She finds the man who once gardened for the Kennedy family, brother and sister, who supplies several useful descriptions of events then. Miss Marple finds the cook from the Halliday household, Edith, who remembers that time well. The Hallidays were soon to move to a house in Norfolk before Helen disappeared. Helen wanted to get away. The servants presumed this was from her husband, but it was not. She was mainly interested in escaping her brother. She did fall in love with Halliday, and loved his daughter.

The Reeds advertise, seeking the Hallidays' former maid Lily. She writes first to Dr Kennedy, thinking he is a friend. She says that she does not believe that Helen ran off, as the clothes packed in her suitcase made no sense (taking an evening gown but not the shoes and belt that go with it). The Reeds and Dr Kennedy agree he should write back to her to arrange a meeting at his present home. Lily never arrives.

The police find Lily's body, strangled, in a copse near the train station. She came by an earlier train, but had Dr Kennedy's letter with her, for the later arrival time. Miss Marple advises Gwenda to tell the police everything. Soon, they are digging up the garden, at the end of the terrace, to find Helen’s body. Gwenda is in the house alone when Dr Kennedy approaches her, ready to kill her by strangling when his attempt to poison her failed. Miss Marple arrives with a container of soapy solution, which she sprays in his eyes to stop the murder attempt.

Dr Kennedy had strangled his sister, saying the closing words from that play, unaware of young Gwenda at the stair railing above. He buried Helen in the garden. He set up her husband to think he had strangled her, but there was no body, so he was taken as insane, and died in a nursing home. His diary from that time showed him to be quite sane, but he could not explain what he had seen, his strangled wife next to him. Kennedy had first given drugs to make Halliday paranoid, and then drugged his drink so Dr Kennedy could pose him next to the strangled Helen. Then Kennedy moved her body again. The letter found with Lily was not the one she received from Kennedy; he switched it after he killed her. He knew the police would see through his scheme. He sent the nanny Leonie home to Switzerland with medicines that killed her. Miss Marple explains all this to the Reeds, the full confession from Kennedy and how they should have seen it from the start, from those words in the play.

Characters

Gwenda Halliday Reed: 21 years old and newly married woman from New Zealand, settling in England with her new husband.
Giles Reed: Gwenda's husband, who met her in New Zealand. Orphaned, as she is, and in a business requiring travel.
Mrs Cocker: cook for the Reed household.
Raymond West: well known author and nephew of Miss Jane Marple.
Joan West: Painter, wife of Raymond, and cousin to Giles Reed.
Miss Jane Marple: Raymond's aunt, loves to garden, and with a way of finding out murderers.
Dr Haydock: Miss Marple's physician, who she talks into advising her to take a trip at the seaside.
Edith (Edie) Pagett: cook to the Halliday home St Catherine (now called Hillside) years earlier, who still resides in Dillmouth.
Leonie: young Swiss woman who was briefly nurse or nanny for the child Gwenda at St Catherine house, and saw something out the nursery window the night Helen disappeared.
Lily Abbott Kimble: house parlourmaid in the Halliday household, who is now married.
Manning: gardener, now 75 years old, to the Kennedy household when Helen was alive.
Major Kelvin Halliday: married to Megan, and father of Gwenda. After Megan died, he remarried to Helen Kennedy, a young woman he met on the ship back to England with his daughter. He died under the delusion that he murdered his second wife.
Alison Danby: Gwenda's aunt who raised her in New Zealand, sister to her late mother.
Helen Spenlove Halliday (née Kennedy): young blonde woman, half-sister to Dr Kennedy, wife to Major Halliday, and stepmother to Gwenda. She was a lively and loving young woman.
Dr James Kennedy: Helen's older half-brother, who raised her once both parents died. He retired from practice soon after his sister disappeared, and now lives in Woodleigh-Bolton.
Jackie (J. J.) Afflick: local boy, first working as clerk in Fane's law firm, dismissed for cause but possibly framed. He briefly socialized with Helen when she returned from school. He is now married to Dorothy, and a businessman with a coach tour service in Devon and Dorset, based in Exeter.
Walter Fane: the local lawyer's son, he tried a tea plantation in India, failed at that, returned to Dillmouth to practise law in his father's firm, always a bachelor. He proposed to Helen, she went out to marry him, but turned him down when she arrived there, realising she did not love him at all.
Richard Erskine: married man who met Helen on the ship to India, when he was travelling alone. They both knew their strong attraction had no future, so gave it up. He resides in Northumberland.
Mrs Janet Erskine: Richard's wife, and mother to their two sons. The family vacationed in Dillmouth at the time when Helen disappeared.
Dr Penrose: staff at Saltmarsh House nursing home in Norfolk where Major Halliday spent the last years of his life.
Inspector Last: first officer to appear on the scene when Lily's body is found.
Detective Inspector Primer: takes the lead on the investigation of Lily's murder and the suspicion of where Helen is buried once Gwenda tells the police all of the story. Colonel Melrose had once pointed Miss Marple out to him.

Writing and publication process

Agatha Christie wrote Curtain (Hercule Poirot's last mystery, which concludes the sleuth's career and life). Sleeping Murder, was written during World War II sonetime during the Blitz, which took place between September 1940 and May 1941. Agatha Christie's literary correspondence files indicate that the initial draft of the novel was written early in 1940.

Christie's notebooks are open to interpretation in hindsight; John Curran argues that Sleeping Murder was still being planned at the end of the 1940s and the beginning of the 1950s. His basis is the many changes to the title of the novel, since other authors had used her first title ideas: one of Christie's notebooks contain references to Cover Her Face (second title) under "Plans for Sept. 1947" and "Plans for Nov. 1948", suggesting she was planning to re-read and revise the manuscript. 

Previous biographers, who did not have access to the Notebooks, state that Sleeping Murder was written in 1940.

Nevertheless, support for the story being first written in 1940 is found in the  correspondence files of Christie's literary agents: Christie's royalty statement for 15 March 1940 states that the secretarial agency hired by Edmund Cork to type up Murder in Retrospect (first title of manuscript) charged £19 13s. 9d. On 7 June 1940 Edmund Cork wrote to Christie advising her that he would have the necessary 'deed of gift' drawn up so her husband Max would become the owner of the unpublished Miss Marple novel. Christie eventually visited Edmund Cork's offices at 40 Fleet Street, London, on 14 October 1940 and signed the document transferring ownership of the copyright of Murder in Retrospect to her husband in consideration of what was termed her "natural love and affection for him".

Christie refers to the last Poirot and Miss Marple novels that she penned during the Second World War in her autobiography. She writes that she had written an extra two books during the first years of the war in anticipation of being killed in the raids, as she was working in London. One was for her daughter, Rosalind Hicks, which she wrote first – a book with Hercule Poirot in it – and the other was for Max – with Miss Marple in it. She adds that these two books, after being composed, were put in the vaults of a bank, and were made over formally by deed of gift to her daughter and husband.

The last Marple novel Christie wrote, Nemesis, was published in 1971, followed by Christie's last Poirot novel Elephants Can Remember in 1972 and then in 1973, her very last novel Postern of Fate. Aware that she would write no more novels, Christie authorised the publication of Curtain in 1975 to send off Poirot. She then arranged to have Sleeping Murder published in 1976, but she died before its publication in October of that year.

By contrast to Poirot, who dies in the final novel, Miss Marple lives on. This last published novel is set in 1944, but follows novels set in later years, which show Miss Marple to have aged. In Nemesis, Miss Marple does no gardening on the advice of her doctor, showing the effects of her more fragile health. In Sleeping Murder, she is frequently pulling bindweed from the neglected garden at the Reeds' home, but that may be a cover for searching for the site of the victim's burial. There is a reference to a wireless set as a desired purchase by Lily, were she to receive money by responding to the newspaper notice seeking her; this reinforces the story's setting being in the 1930s, as the author intended in her final revisions (done in 1950).

Title changes

Christie's original manuscript of Sleeping Murder was entitled Murder in Retrospect after one of the chapters in the book. When the Hercule Poirot novel Five Little Pigs was later serialized in the US in Collier's Weekly from September to November 1941, the magazine's editing board retitled it Murder in Retrospect. This was also the title used by Christie's American publisher Dodd Mead and Company, presumably in order to capitalize on the recent US serialization. Christie's original manuscript of Sleeping Murder was duly retitled Cover Her Face.

Following the publication of P.D. James's début crime novel Cover Her Face in 1962, Christie became aware of the need to think up yet another title for the last Miss Marple book. She wrote to Edmund Cork on 17 July 1972, asking him to send her a copy of the unpublished Miss Marple manuscript and a copy of Max's deed of gift. So much time had passed that she was unable to remember if the manuscript was still called Cover Her Face or She Died Young.

Allusions to other works

 When the police inspector sees Miss Marple he comments on a case of poison pen near Lymstock, which is the plot of The Moving Finger.
 Early in the novel, Miss Marple has a brief conversation with Colonel Arthur Bantry, her neighbour in St Mary Mead, whose death was referenced in The Mirror Crack'd from Side to Side, published in 1962, emphasizing the 1945 setting of Sleeping Murder. Detective Inspector Primer mentions that Colonel Melrose pointed her out to him in the past, after telling Gwenda that Miss Marple was well known to the Chief Constables of three counties, who relied on her, but was not yet his chief.
 In Sleeping Murder, the concept of an unknown person, X, is briefly used by the characters figuring out what happened to Helen. In Curtain, Poirot's last case, written about the same time, Captain Hastings refers to the murderer Poirot seeks as Mr X. The notation is used throughout Curtain, but just briefly in Sleeping Murder. In both novels, X proved to be a character already well-known to other characters in the novel.
 The plot of John Webster's 17th-century play, The Duchess of Malfi, concerns a woman who is strangled by her brother because of the man she married, which is exactly Dr. Kennedy's situation as to his sister. Miss Marple at the end says she should have known all along it was Kennedy, because of the words he uttered, words that triggered Gwenda's deeply held memory.
 There is a slight plot similarity to her 1968 novel By the Pricking of My Thumbs, which featured her characters Tommy and Tuppence Beresford. When Gwenda visits the sanatorium to find out about Kelvin Halliday, a lady says, "Was it your poor child? Behind the fireplace?" Christie re-uses that delusion in this novel.

Literary significance and reception
George Thaw in the Daily Mirror of 22 October 1976 said, "Agatha Christie's last novel is very good. Sleeping Murder is the last of Miss Marple's excursions into detection. But perhaps it is her best. Agatha Christie wrote it years ago but if I was going to pick a swansong book this is certainly the one that I would choose. It's her best for years."

Robert Barnard: "Slightly somniferous mystery, written in the 'forties but published after Christie's death. Concerns a house where murder has been committed, bought (by the merest coincidence) by someone who as a child saw the body. Sounds like Ross Macdonald, and certainly doesn't read like vintage Christie. But why should an astute businesswoman hold back one of her better performances for posthumous publication?"
It was one of the bestselling books of 1976.

Adaptations

Television
BBC adaptation
Sleeping Murder was filmed by the BBC as a 100-minute film in the sixth adaptation (of twelve) in the series Miss Marple starring Joan Hickson as Miss Marple. It was transmitted in two 50-minute parts on Sunday, 11 January and Sunday, 18 January 1987. This adaptation is fairly true to the plot of the novel.

Adapter: Ken Taylor
Director: John Davies

Cast:
Joan Hickson as Miss Marple
Geraldine Alexander as Gwenda Reed
John Moulder Brown as Giles Reed
Frederick Treves as Dr James Kennedy
Jean Anderson as Mrs Fane
Terrence Hardiman as Walter Fane
John Bennett as Richard Erskine
Geraldine Newman as Janet Erskine
Jack Watson as Mr Foster
Joan Scott as Mrs Cocker
Jean Heywood as Edith Paget
Georgine Anderson as Mrs Hengrave
Edward Jewesbury as Mr Sims
David McAlister as Raymond West
Amanda Boxer as Joan West
Esmond Knight as Mr Galbraith
John Ringham as Dr Penrose
Eryl Maynard as Lily Kimble
Ken Kitson as Jim Kimble
Kenneth Cope as Jackie "JJ" Afflick
Peter Spraggon as Detective Inspector Last
Sheila Raynor as shop assistant
Donald Burton as Bosola (onstage)
Struan Rodger as Ferdinand (onstage)
Gary Watson as Major Kelvin Halliday

Syrian adaptation
The novel was adapted to a Syrian drama series, "جريمة في الذاكرة" "Crime in the Memory" that was broadcast in 1992.

Japanese animated adaptation
The novel was adapted as a set of 4 episodes of the Japanese animated television series Agatha Christie's Great Detectives Poirot and Marple, airing in 2005.

ITV adaptation
A second British television adaptation, set in 1951, was transmitted on 5 February 2006 as part of ITV's Agatha Christie's Marple, starring Geraldine McEwan and Sophia Myles, as Miss Marple and Gwenda, respectively. This adaptation had numerous plot changes. The most significant change is at the end it is revealed that Gwenda's mother and stepmother were one and the same person. Claire was a jewel thief and to escape the Indian Police-Detectives, she faked her death and assumed the identity of "Helen Marsden". Other changes include the deletion of some of Helen's suitors, and the addition of a travelling company of performers called The Funnybones, which Helen was performing with at the time of her death. Dr Kennedy became the half-brother of Kelvin's first wife, (whose name is changed from Megan to Claire). Gwenda has an absent fiancé, Charles, rather than a husband. At the end, Gwenda leaves him and becomes engaged to a member of his company, Hugh Hornbeam. Dr Kennedy does not try to kill Gwenda and does not appear to be crazy, merely that he was in love with his sister and killed her so no one could have her. Kelvin is not taken to hospital and drugged by Dr Kennedy with datura. Instead, he is murdered when Dr Kennedy pushes him over a rocky cliff.

Adapter: Stephen Churchett
Director: Edward Hall
Cast:
Geraldine McEwan as Miss Jane Marple
Russ Abbot as Chief Inspector Arthur Primer
Geraldine Chaplin as Mrs Fane
Phil Davis as Dr James Alfred Kennedy
Dawn French as Janet Erskine
Martin Kemp as Jackie Afflick
Aidan McArdle as Hugh Hornbeam
Paul McGann as Dickie Erskine
Sophia Myles as Gwenda Halliday
Anna-Louise Plowman as Helen Marsden
Peter Serafinowicz as Walter Fane
Una Stubbs as Edith Pagett
Julian Wadham as Kelvin Halliday
Sarah Parish as Evie Ballantine
Emilio Doorgasingh as Sergeant Desai
Harry Treadaway as George Erskine
Richard Bremmer as Mr Sims
Harriet Walter as the Duchess of Malfi (onstage)
Greg Hicks as Ferdinand (onstage)
Mary Healey as Shop Assistant
Helen Coker as Lily Tutt
Nickolas Grace as Lionel Luff
Vince Leigh as Jim Tutt
Darren Carnall as Dresser

French adaptation
The tenth episode of the French television series Les Petits Meurtres d'Agatha Christie was an adaptation of this novel. It aired in 2012.

Radio

The novel was adapted as a 90-minute play for BBC Radio 4 and transmitted as part of the Saturday Play strand on 8 December 2001. June Whitfield reprised her role as Miss Marple (she played Miss Marple in several radio adaptations in the 20th century). It was recorded on 10 October 2001.

Adapter: Michael Bakewell
Producer: Enyd Williams

Cast:
June Whitfield as Miss Marple
Julian Glover as Dr Kennedy
Beth Chalmers as Gwenda Reed
Carl Prekopp as Giles Reed
Hilda Schroder as Mrs Hengrave
Carolyn Pickles as Aunt Alison and Mrs Erskine
Joan Littlewood as Edith
Derek Waring as Richard Erskine
Ioan Meredith as Walter Fane
Michael N. Harbour as Jackie Afflick
Ewan Bailey as Inspector Last

Publication history
 1976, Collins Crime Club (London), October 1976, Hardcover, 224 pp; 
 1976, Dodd Mead and Company (New York), Hardcover, 242 pp; 
 1977, Fontana Books (Imprint of HarperCollins), Paperback, 192 pp
 1977, Bantam Books, Paperback
 1978, Ulverscroft Large-print Edition, Hardcover, 358 pp; 
 1990 GK Hall & Company Large-print edition, Hardcover; 
 2006, Marple Facsimile edition (Facsimile of 1976 UK first edition), 2 May 2006, Hardcover; 

In the US the novel was serialised in Ladies' Home Journal in two abridged instalments from July (Volume XCIII, Number 7) to August 1976 (Volume XCIII, Number 8) with an illustration by Fred Otnes.

References

External links
Sleeping Murder at the official Agatha Christie website
Wiki collection of quotations from Sleeping Murder

1940 British novels
1976 British novels
British novels adapted into films
Collins Crime Club books
Miss Marple novels
British novels adapted into television shows
Novels first published in serial form
Novels set in the 1930s
Novels set in England
Novels set in London
Sororicide in fiction
Works originally published in Ladies' Home Journal
Novels published posthumously